Attié (Akie, Akye, Atche, Atie, Atshe) is a language of uncertain classification within the Kwa branch of the Niger–Congo family. It is spoken by perhaps half a million people in Ivory Coast.

Writing system 

A vowel followed by <n> indicates nasalisation.

Tones are indicated with a diacritic before or after the syllable :

References

Works cited
 

Languages of Ivory Coast
Lagoon languages